Cnephasitis vietnamensis is a species of moth of the family Tortricidae. It is found in northern Vietnam.

The wingspan is about 26 mm for males and 29 mm for females. The ground colour of the forewings is greyish, mixed with white before the median fascia. The strigulation (fine streaks) and dots are grey and the markings are grey with darker and paler areas. The hindwings are cream grey. The ground colour of the forewings of the females is pale grey with some dark grey dots. They have dirty cream hindwings.

Etymology
The name refers to the country of origin, Vietnam.

References

Moths described in 2008
Polyorthini